Kevin Primeau (born January 3, 1955 in Edmonton, Alberta) is a retired professional ice hockey player who played two games in the National Hockey League (NHL) with the Vancouver Canucks. He also played seven games in the World Hockey Association with the Edmonton Oilers. Primeau also represented Canada at the 1980 Winter Olympics where he scored 4 goals and 1 assist in 6 games. He is later served as the head coach of the Swiss team HC La Chaux-de-Fonds. He also was the head coach of the Hungarian team Alba Volán Székesfehérvár, and the Hungarian national team.

Family
Kevin's son Josh plays professionally in the Swiss League with HC Sierre, and his other son Ben was the captain of the Fernie Ghostriders in the KIJHL.

Career statistics

Regular season and playoffs

International

References

External links

1956 births
Living people
Alberta Golden Bears ice hockey players
Canadian expatriate ice hockey players in Switzerland
Canadian ice hockey coaches
Canadian ice hockey right wingers
Edmonton Oilers (WHA) players
Edmonton Oilers coaches
HC Davos players
Ice hockey players at the 1980 Winter Olympics
Olympic ice hockey players of Canada
Ice hockey people from Edmonton
Undrafted National Hockey League players
Vancouver Canucks players